Leidya ucae is an isopoda parasite present in the waters off the coast of China. First described in 1930 by Pearse.

Etymology 
The species name "ucae" is in reference to the type of crab it infects, the species used to be in the genus Uca.

Description 
L. infelix is a species known to parasitize Tubuca forcipata, a species of fiddler crab.

References 

 
Cymothoida
Crustaceans described in 1930